Mauro Daniel González Villarroel (born 25 May 1985) is a Chilean politician and lawyer who currently serves as member of the Chamber of Deputies of Chile.

References

External links
 

1985 births
Living people
21st-century Chilean lawyers
Gabriela Mistral University alumni
Santo Tomás University alumni
21st-century Chilean politicians
National Renewal (Chile) politicians
People from Santiago